Frederick King Keller (born 1954 in Buffalo, New York) is an American director, producer, and screenwriter for film and television. He is also credited under the names Frederick K. Keller, Fred K. Keller and Fred Keller. He is the son of actor/screenwriter Frederick A. Keller. His father was a television pioneer who produced and directed the first weekly dramatic series seen on television. Besides acting and directing in theater his father also ran several art-house movie theaters in Buffalo which the young Fred became intimately involved with and which formed the root of his cinematic education.

While earning his Bachelor of Arts in English from Hamilton College he was able to meet, study, and work with Nat Boxer, one of Francis Ford Coppola's favorite technicians, then at Hamilton's sister school Kirkland College. While still in school, Fred produced and directed several short films, one of which, A Winter's Tale, was screened at the Cannes Film Festival.

After producing and directing several short drama films for the Communications Office of the Catholic Diocese of Buffalo (one of which, A Midnight Clear, won a Gabriel Award), they asked him to develop and direct a feature-length film for local television entitled Skeleton Key. Following the success of that endeavor and due to a connection made at college with the author Natalie Babbitt, Fred produced and directed the original film based on her book Tuck Everlasting. He followed that up with another Babbitt adaptation, The Eyes of the Amaryllis. His third independently produced and directed film was Vamping, starring Patrick Duffy.

Partly due to the success of these films, especially the Babbitt films for young audiences, Fred was engaged to direct half of the episodes for Nickelodeon's first sitcom, Hey Dude, shot entirely on location in Tucson, AZ. The directing of over 200 hours of television followed, including multiple episodes of New York Undercover, The Pretender, House, 24,  CSI: Miami,  Boomtown,  Numb3rs, Life and Blue Bloods. He has also been either the Producer or Supervising Producer on a number of shows including The Pretender, Boomtown and Blue Bloods. Most recently he returned to short form with the pilot for the series Weight which won the 2016 WGA Award for Short Form New Media-Original.

In addition to his film and television career Keller has also directed numerous plays and two operas.

References

External links 

Fred K. Keller website

1954 births
American film directors
Film producers from New York (state)
American male screenwriters
American television directors
Television producers from New York (state)
Living people
Artists from Buffalo, New York
Screenwriters from New York (state)